The  Young Lords, also known as the Young Lords Organization (YLO) or Young Lords Party (YLP), was a Chicago-based street gang that became a civil and human rights organization. The group aims to fight for neighborhood empowerment and self-determination for Puerto Rico, Latinos, and colonized ("Third World") people. Tactics used by the Young Lords include mass education, canvassing, community programs, occupations, and direct confrontation. The Young Lords became targets of the United States FBI's COINTELPRO program.

In party platform points, the Young Lords may spell "American" as "amerikkkan" or "Amerikkkan"—expressing, among other things, opposition to U.S. military presence in Puerto Rico and suggesting that America's success is rooted in white supremacy. The platform follows the mission clearly, stating: "We demand immediate withdrawal of U.S. military forces and bases from Puerto Rico, Vietnam, and all oppressed communities inside and outside the U.S. No Puerto Rican should serve in the U.S. Army against his brothers and sisters, for the only true army of oppressed people is the people's army to fight all rulers."

History

Origins
The Young Lords started in 1960 in Chicago's Lincoln Park neighborhood as a Puerto Rican turf gang. On Grito de Lares, September 23, 1968, Jose Cha Cha Jimenez reorganized them and formed the Young Lords as a national political and civil rights movement. The new community-wide movement then spread to nearly 30 cities, including three branches in New York, which at the time served as the entry point for 90% of Puerto Ricans. In addition, the Young Lords began operating free programs for the community. In addition to their support for Puerto Ricos' independence, all Latino nations, and oppressed nations of the world, the Young Lords also supported neighborhood empowerment. The radical movement of the Young Lords modeled themselves after the Black Panther Party, calling for a vanguard of revolutionary minority parties coming together that felt oppressed by a system that wasn’t designed to be of assistance to minorities. 

The Young Lords' focus remains self-determination for Puerto Rico, other Latino and Third World countries, and for neighborhood-controlled development. The movement expanded from Chicago to include a broader audience and chapters in 30 cities, including three branches in New York City, the port of entry for the majority of Puerto Rican migrants.

During Mayor Daley's tenure in Chicago, a program of urban renewal resulted in Puerto Ricans in Lincoln Park and several Mexican communities being evicted from what became prime real estate areas near the Loop, Lakefront, Old Town, and Lakeview neighborhoods. The rationale was to increase property tax revenues by luring White, middle-class suburbanites and creating a suburb within the city. Some Young Lords were involved in the Puerto Rican June 1966 Division Street Riots in Wicker Park and Humboldt Park.

The 1968 Democratic Convention protests in Grant Park and the adjacent Lincoln Park Neighborhood, resulted in the Young Lords, under the leadership of founder José Cha Cha Jiménez, to join with others to form a broader civil and human rights movement.  Puerto Rican self-determination and the displacement of Puerto Ricans and poor residents became the primary issues of organizing. The Young Lords organization also began to train students and youth to take on the leadership to organize the Latino community on a national level.

Multiple chapters formed nationwide based on the original Chicago chapter, including several branches in New York City and along the East Coast. The National Headquarters in Chicago asked the loose coalition of chapters in New York to unite as a single regional branch. All chapters considered neighborhood empowerment and Puerto Rican self-determination as unifying missions.

The Great Migrations of the late 1940s resulted in many Puerto Ricans coming to the mainland for opportunity and settling in the Midwest, Florida, and on the East Coast of the United States. Chicago, one of he most populated center of the Puerto Rican diaspora, took on a significant role as a regional headquarters of the movement.

The office in Chicago attempted to construct a nationwide grassroots movement within the U.S. barrios to unite Puerto Ricans, other Latinos, and carry out its mission for Puerto Rican independence. The New York City regional chapter formed July 26, 1969, ten months after the Young Lords Movement began in Chicago. The National Headquarters in Chicago had gained national prominence by leading protests against conditions faced by Puerto Ricans in the U.S. Because most members in New York were students with a middle-class income, who were media-savvy, the New York chapter flourished. It provided needed support for the National Headquarters then under surveillance by the F.B.I. and the Chicago city government.

The National Headquarters' first action was to ransack and close the Department of Urban Renewal office in Chicago. The Young Lords attended an Urban Renewal meeting and told the panel of the local neighborhood association that no more meetings would be permitted in Lincoln Park until people of color were included on the Urban Renewal Board.

On July 27, 1969, the chapter office in New York City mounted a "Garbage Offensive" to commemorate the 1968 Sanitation Strike and to protest the substandard garbage collection service in East Harlem. The event also promoted the opening of the Young Lords' New York City office. The offensives targeted local city services and were aligned with the National Headquarters mission to develop  neighborhood empowerment. In Chicago, the Young Lords occupied local institutions in the Lincoln Park neighborhood to support low-income housing for working families.

The New York members had first read about the Chicago Young Lords in an issue of the Black Panther newspaper. It reported actions for Puerto Rican and Latino self-determination and publicized the increasing repression of Jose "Cha Cha" Jimenez and the Chicago National Headquarters. The New York office followed the actions of the People's Church in Chicago and took over the First Spanish United Methodist Church in East Harlem. Over 100 members were arrested in the two-week takeover. National Headquarters members encouraged the New York members not to resist arrests, in order to avoid bloodshed.

The New York occupation of First Spanish United Methodist Church in East Harlem took place on December 28, 1969, after several similar actions in Chicago: the sit-in at Grant Hospital, the take-over of People's Park, the occupation of McCormick Seminary, and the occupation of Chicago's People's Church (Armitage Avenue United Methodist Church). In several cities, the Young Lords set up free community programs, such as breakfast and classes. United Methodist Pastor Rev. Bruce Johnson, of the North Side Cooperative Ministry, worked to obtain funds to support the Young Lords programs. Rev. Sergio Herrera, a Cuban assistant pastor of the Young Lords People's Church in Chicago, did not initially agree with their occupation of the church, nor of their murals of Che Guevara and Pedro Albizu Campos. Later he participated in all the neighborhood events.

Occupying the Armitage Avenue United Methodist Church in May 1969, the Young Lords set up programs inside what they called the People's Church. The building remained a church but also served as the Young Lords National Headquarters for nearly two years. UMC Bishop Pryor was pressured to oust the two UMC ministers and the Young Lords from the People's Church by Alderman George Barr McCutcheon and members of the Lincoln Park Conservation Association. The Court fined the People's Church $200 each day the free daycare center remained open.

On September 29, 1969, the church's pastor and his wife, Reverend Bruce and Eugenia Ransier Johnson, were stabbed to death, killed in their home. The case remains open and has yet to be solved. The assistant Pastor, Rev. Sergio Herrera, was transferred soon afterward to Los Angeles, where he was also murdered. The murders occurred while the two ministers were working with the Young Lords in those cities. That is also a cold case.

Hampton had created an alliance with the Young Lords via the Rainbow Coalition. Two months later, Chicago police killed Black Panthers Fred Hampton and Mark Clark in a raid on Hampton's apartment, on December 4, 1969.

Expansion
The Puerto Rican nation's diaspora has been divided and has created multiple neighborhoods or barrios in Florida, along the East Coast of the United States, New York City and Chicago. These Puerto Rican mainland communities developed across the U.S. during Operation Bootstrap which gave way to the Great Puerto Rican Migration of the late 1940s and early 1950s. In 1968, branches of the Young Lords sprouted up in Chicago, New York, Philadelphia, Connecticut, New Jersey, Boston, Milwaukee, Hayward (California), San Diego, Los Angeles, and Puerto Rico.

The organizations' newspapers, The Young Lord, Pitirre, and Pa'lante, reported the increasingly militant activities of the Young Lords. Over 120 publicly accessible oral histories, "Young Lords in Lincoln Park" are curated at Grand Valley State University in Michigan.

Besides the coalition with the National Black Panther Party Office in Oakland and the Black Panthers in Chicago, integrated into by the Rainbow Coalition of Fred Hampton, the Young Lords also participated in coalitions with groups of the Puerto Rican Independence Movement, Northside Cooperative Ministry and the Lincoln Park Poor People's Coalition.

The Young Lords grew into a national movement under the leadership of Jose Cha Cha Jimenez which also included Angela Lind Adorno, Alberto Chavarria, Marta Chavarria, Andres Nunez, Edwin Diaz, Jose (Cosmoe) Torres, Eddie Ramirez, Raul Lugo, Juan Gonzalez, Felipe Luciano, Iris Morales, Judy Cordero, Denise Oliver, Pablo Yoruba Guzman, Hilda Ignatin, Maria Romero, Omar Lopez, David Rivera, Tony Baez, Richie Perez, and Juan Fi Ortiz.

By May 1970 due to infiltration by the local Red Squad, the Gang Intelligence Unit, Chicago Patronage Machine and COINTELPRO, the New York regional office broke away from the Young Lords National Headquarters and formed the short lived Young Lords Party. The separation also resulted from rapid development, growing pains, and a friendly competition between U.S. cities. The infiltration and divisions created conflict between the chapters and division of the Puerto Rican Independence Movement. Branches on the east coast were forced to remain affiliated with the New York regional office. Most other chapters remained loyal to the Chicago National Headquarters. The separation was a major blow to the liberation movement in the U.S. The separation occurred in other movements such as the Black Panthers, Students for a Democratic Society, The Young Patriots and the American Indian Movement, as revealed in COINTELPRO documents.

Women in the Young Lords participated in community organizing and wrote newspaper articles against sexism and patriarchy including the "Young Lords Party Position Paper on Women", published in 1970, and included in The Young Lords: A Reader (2010), edited by Darrel Enck-Wanzer.

The Young Lords in New York and Chicago continued to grow in numbers and influence from 1968 to 1983. Jose Cha Cha Jimenez introduced the newly elected African American mayor of Chicago, Harold Washington, to a June crowd of 100,000 Puerto Ricans that the Young Lords helped organize in Humboldt Park, Chicago.

Repression
The Young Lords were a target of the FBI's COINTELPRO program that targeted Puerto Rican independence groups. The New York-Chicago schism mirrored the divisions within other New Left groups including the Black Panther Party, Students for a Democratic Society and Brown Berets, often as a result of COINTELPRO activities of police infiltration by informants and provocateurs. The Young Lords leaders were framed and discredited by both Mayor Richard J. Daley forces and the FBI. The entire Chicago leadership of the Young Lords was forced underground to reorganize and avoid complete destruction. COINTELPRO tactics used against the movements such as the Young Lords included rumor campaigns and pitting groups against each other to create factionalism, distrust, and personality conflicts. In Chicago, COINTELPRO created an anti-Rainbow Coalition component. The Red Squad also monitored the Young Lords National Headquarters 24 hours a day. Jose Cha Cha Jimenez became a main police target and was indicted 18 times in a six-week period on felony charges including assault and battery on police and creating a mob action. The intent of the police action was to cripple the organization. While the Young Lords advocated armed strategies similar to those advocated by the Black Panthers, the basis was as a right to self-defense. Such self defense was advocated after the shooting of Manuel Ramos, the suspected police involvement in the death of José (Pancho) Lind, the alleged suicide of Julio Roldan while in the custody of the New York Police Department, the fatal stabbings in Chicago of the United Methodist Church Rev. Bruce Johnson and his wife Eugenia, and the murder of Assistant Pastor Sergio Herrera shortly after his transfer to Los Angeles. The Young Lords accused the FBI CointelPro of a conspiracy to murder Young Lords and Black Panthers.

The Young Lords worked in their communities to provide resources, similar to actions of the Brown Berets and the Black Panther Party. A goal was to raise awareness of the oppression and educate on the history and struggle of the Puerto Ricans. The Young Lords: A Reader (2010), edited by Darrel Enck-Wanzer details the purpose, goals, and tactics of the Young Lords New York chapter.  He wrote, "Puerto Ricans have suffered as a group, racially and culturally, not as individuals. Therefore the fight for self determination must be a group struggle." Enck-Wanzer's book details that every Puerto Rican has suffered and felt the pain of their fellow Puerto Rican brothers, sisters, friends, and relatives. His book argues that Puerto Ricans must fight for their nation against American colonialism by organizing and educating in the barrios and raise awareness of the repression since the creation of the Young Lords as a movement in the Lincoln Park neighborhood.

Decline
By 1973, the Young Lords and its leadership were in disarray. Jose Cha Cha Jimenez along with many central committee members set up an underground training school at a farm near Tomah, Wisconsin. Some members continued independent efforts around self-determination for Puerto Rico and neighborhood empowerment. In Chicago, the Young Lords resurfaced after two and a half years.  The New York Young Lords and other chapters also continued to function.

After Jimenez served a year in prison, in 1975 he ran for alderman of the 46th Ward against Mayor Daley's machine candidate. He garnered 39% of the vote against the Democratic candidate, Chris Cohen. The election re-energized the symbolic Rainbow Coalition formed by Black Panthers, Young Patriots, Young Lords and other groups and communities.

In 1983, the Young Lords organized the first major Latino event for the successful campaign of Chicago's first African-American mayor, Harold Washington. After Washington's victory, Jiménez introduced the mayor to a crowd of 100,000 Puerto Ricans in Humboldt Park in June 1983 where the Young Lords distributed 30,000 buttons inscribed with "Tengo Puerto Rico En Mi Corazon." In the fall of 1995, Jose Cha Cha Jimenez brought together Chicago Young Lords' Tony Baez, Carlos Flores, Angel Del Rivero, Omar López and Angie Lind Adorno to form the Lincoln Park Project to collect the history of the Young Lords movement. They curated the history and documented the displaced Latinos of the Lincoln Park Neighborhood. In support of the Puerto Rican Vieques campers, the struggle for Puerto Rican independence, and against the displacement of Puerto Ricans in the Diaspora, the Young Lords organized the Lincoln Park Camp near Grand Rapids, Michigan, on September 23, 2002.

The Young Lords supported freed Puerto Rican nationalist leaders and urban guerrilla groups such as the Macheteros. Other Young Lords members joined Maoist formations such as the Puerto Rican Revolutionary Workers Party or provided the leadership of the National Congress for Puerto Rican Rights (NCPRR). Some Young Lords worked in the media, such as Juan González of the New York Daily News and Democracy Now!, Pablo "Yoruba" Guzmán at WCBS-TV New York, Felipe Luciano and Miguel "Mickey" Meléndez of WBAI-FM New York.

Organization

13 Point Program of the Young Lords
The National Headquarters Young Lords' mission called for self determination for Puerto Rico, all Latino nations, all oppressed nations of the world, and for barrio empowerment. The Young Lords also created a 10-point program modeled after the Black Panthers 10 point program. The New York office created a 13-point program after they split from Chicago National Headquarters as follows:

 We want self-determination for Puerto Ricans—Liberation on the island and inside the United States.
 We want self-determination for all Latinos.
 We want liberation for all third world people.
 We are revolutionary nationalists and oppose racism.
 We want community control of our institutions and land.
 We want true education of our creole culture.
 We oppose capitalists and alliances with traitors.
 We oppose the amerikkkan military.
 We want freedom for all political prisoners.
 We want equality for women. Machismo must be revolutionary ... not oppressive.
 We fight anti-Communism with international unity.
 We believe armed self-defense and armed struggle are the only means to liberation.
 We want a socialist society.

In November 1970, that platform was revised. The revised 5th point called for women's equality and opposed male chauvinism. The revised 6th point focused on community control of institutions and land. The revised 7th point demanded education of the Afro-Indio culture and the Spanish language. The revised 10th point called for freedom for political prisoners.  The revised 11th point focused on the group's internationalist perspective.

Social action
The Young Lords' mission supported self determination for Puerto Rico, Latino nations, all oppressed nations, and also supported neighborhood empowerment. The mission is reflected in the Young Lords logo of a map of Puerto Rico, a brown fist holding a rifle, and the words "Tengo Puerto Rico en mi Corazon" ("I have Puerto Rico in my heart"). The Young Lords envisioned themselves as the vanguard of a people's struggle as they initially fought against the displacement of Puerto Ricans from Lincoln Park.

In New York, the Young Lords followed the lead of Chicago related to city services with the "Garbage Offensive" as a preliminary action. Organizers spent weeks cleaning up garbage in Puerto Rican communities. In need of additional cleaning supplies, they asked the New York City Department of Sanitation for assistance and were refused. Disgruntled, the Young Lords blocked 3rd Avenue traffic at 110th, 111th, and 112th Street.

The original urban renewal campaign was framed by the Chicago office as the modern day land question inspired by Emiliano Zapata who said, "all revolutions are based on land."

The Young Lords created community projects similar to those of the Black Panthers, yet centralized around Latinos.  The programs included free breakfast for children, the Emeterio Betances free health clinic, community testing for tuberculosis and lead-poisoning, free clothing drives, cultural events, and Puerto Rican history classes. In Chicago, the Young Lords set up a free dental clinic and community day care center and worked on solidarity for incarcerated Puerto Ricans and the rights of Vietnam War veterans. The New York female leadership advocated for women's rights. In Chicago, women advocacy was led by Hilda Ignatin, Judy Cordero and Angela Adorno, in a subgroup known as Mothers And Others, that also helped to educate the male members and the community at large.

The Young Lords carried out many direct-action occupations of vacant land, hospitals, churches and other institutions to demand programs for the poor. The direct actions included a campaign to force New York City to increase garbage pick-up in Spanish Harlem, and in Chicago the seven-day McCormick Theological Seminary take-over that won Lincoln Park residents $650,000 for low-income housing, and the four-month People's Park camp-out/take-over at Halsted and Armitage Avenue by 350 community residents that prevented the construction of a for-profit tennis court on land used for low incoming housing. In New York, the local health-care activism was carried out with the Health Revolutionary Unity Movement. In Chicago, the Young Lords' health program was coordinated by Jack Johns, Quentin Young, Ana Lucas, and Alberto and Marta Chavarria who also worked with a Black Panther-led coalition to recruit medical-student organizations like the Medical Committee for Human Rights (MCHR) to advocate for health care for the poor.

Women 

In their position paper, the Young Lords asserted that colonized women (Puerto Ricans, blacks, "Third World") were oppressed within society and their homes due to their sex, race/ethnicity, nationality and class. Thus, activism among these women was understood as "the revolution within the revolution." The Young Lords recognized that "Third World women have an integral role to play in the liberation of all oppressed people."

Legacy

Cultural influence

The Young Lords inspired young community leaders, professionals, and artists, forming part of a Puerto Rican cultural renaissance in the 1970s. In New York City, the renaissance was called the Nuyorican Movement and became a nationwide development including poetry and music. Felipe Luciano, a poet in Harlem's black nationalist circles, became the Deputy Chairman of the New York regional chapter. He was expelled for male chauvinism and opportunism by the Young Lords Party, though the Young Lords National Headquarters never recognized the expulsion. His poems written while a member of The Last Poets, including Jíbaro, Un Rifle Oración and Hey Now. The poet Pedro Pietri wrote and recited his poems "Puerto Rican Obituary" and "Suicide Note of a Cockroach in a Low Income Project" at New York Young Lord events. Alfredo Matias wrote poems about Afro-Boricua pride and David Hernández recited La Armitage about the Chicago street that became the downtown for Puerto Ricans and the Young Lords. The song "Qué Bonita Bandera" ("What a Beautiful Flag") was written by Pepe y Flora in Puerto Rico and adopted by the Young Lords as their anthem.

Remembrance
The documentary Palante, Siempre Palante! The Young Lords, produced by Iris Morales, aired on PBS in 1996.  In 2015, a retrospective "¡Presente! The Young Lords in New York," was held in New York City.

In 2001, Omar López, Minister of Information of the Young Lords was asked to donate by the Lincoln Park Project archival material that had been used in the Young Lords newspapers. The materials are now curated in DePaul University's Special Collections and Archives Department and a portion digitized as part of DePaul's Digital Collection. In 2012, 120 oral, audio, and visual histories were collected by Jimenez. They are currently online and are housed at Seidman College of Grand Valley State University.

Many books have been published by the Young Lords including in 2010  New York University Press The Young Lords: A Reader, edited by Darrel Enck-Wanzer with a foreword by former Young Lords Iris Morales and Denise Oliver-Vélez. The book primarily covers the Young Lords New York chapter through documents such as speeches and articles from Pa'lante, the Young Lords Newspaper, interviews, posters, and photographs.

Artist Sophia Dawson created "Women of the Young Lords", included in the 2015 Bronx Museum exhibition, ¡Presente! The Young Lords in New York.

Darrel Wanzer-Serrano's account of The New York Young Lords and the Struggle for Liberation authored in 2015 characterizes the roots of the local chapter.

The Puerto Rican activist group El Grito de Sunset Park, co-founded by Dennis Flores, had ties to and was influenced by the Young Lords.

See also
 1970 Lincoln Hospital takeover
 Jose Cha Cha Jimenez
 Puerto Rican Independence Party
 Women of the Young Lords
 The Young Lords: A Reader

Footnotes

Further reading
 Abramson, Michael et al. Palante: Young Lords Party. New York: McGraw-Hill Book Company, 1971.
 
 
 González, Juan. Harvest of Empire: A History of Latinos in America. New York: Penguin, 2001.
 
 Jeffries, Judson. "From Gang-bangers to Urban Revolutionaries: The Young Lords of Chicago," Journal of the Illinois State Historical Society, vol. 96, no. 3 (Autumn 2003), pp. 288–304.
 Melendez, Miguel "Mickey," We Took the Streets: Fighting for Latino Rights with the Young Lords. New York: St. Martin's Press, 2003.
 Wanzer-Serrano, Darrel. The New York Young Lords and the Struggle for Liberation. Philadelphia: Temple University Press, 2015.
 Wanzer, Darrel Enck-. The Young Lords: A Reader. Foreword by Iris Morales and Denise Oliver-Velez. New York University Press, 2010.

External links

 Young Lords Newspaper Collection at DePaul University Library - Digital Collections
 nationalyounglords.com - Archived website
 Young Lords in Lincoln Park - Grand Valley State University Special Collections & University Archives
 Rainbow Coalition - Grand Valley State University Digital Collection

 
Organizations established in 1968
1968 establishments in Illinois
COINTELPRO targets
Anti-fascist organizations in the United States
Anti-racism in the United States
Far-left politics in the United States
Former gangs in Chicago
Hispanic-American gangs
Puerto Rican culture in Chicago
Puerto Rican nationalism
Socialism in the United States
Latino street gangs
Youth activists
DePaul University Special Collections and Archives holdings